The 15th Michigan Infantry Regiment was an infantry regiment that served in the Union Army during the American Civil War.

Service
The 15th Michigan Infantry was organized at Ypsilanti and Detroit, Michigan, between October 16, 1861, and March 13, 1862, and was mustered into Federal service for a three-year enlistment on March 20, 1862 .

The regiment was mustered out of service on August 18, 1865.

Total strength and casualties
The regiment suffered 335 fatalities over the course of the war. 3 officers and 60 enlisted men were killed in action or from wounds sustained in combat. The other 4 officers and 268 enlisted men died of disease.

Commanders
 Colonel John Morrison Oliver
 Colonel Frederick Sharpe Hutchinson

See also
List of Michigan Civil War Units
Michigan in the American Civil War

Notes

References
The Civil War Archive

Units and formations of the Union Army from Michigan
1865 disestablishments in Michigan
1861 establishments in Michigan
Military units and formations established in 1861
Military units and formations disestablished in 1865